Dead angle is a battle term that refers to a location that cannot be defended against. It may also refer to:
Dead Angle, a 1988 video game from Seibu Kaihatsu
A location at Cheatham Hill in Kennesaw Mountain National Battlefield Park, once known as the "Dead Angle."
"Dead Angle", a song by the Japanese band Saver Tiger.
The Dead Angle, a short story collection by Aleksandar Tišma
"Dead Angle", an episode of the anime Golgo 13.
"The Dead Angle", a volume of the manga Monster.